Eric Esso (born 21 June 1994) is a Ghanaian professional footballer who plays as midfielder for Ghanaian Premier League side Ashanti Gold S.C. He is the brother of Ghanaian footballer Joseph Esso.

Club career 
Esso was signed by Ashanti Gold in December 2019. Prior to that he had featured for Heart of Lions F.C. He featured for Ashanti Gold during the 2020–21 CAF Confederation Cup.

Personal life 
Esso is the older brother of fellow professional footballer Joseph Esso.

References

External links 

 
 

Living people
1994 births
Association football midfielders
Ghanaian footballers
Ashanti Gold SC players
Ghana Premier League players
Heart of Lions F.C. players